Milioner is third studio album by Macedonian pop musician, Elena Risteska. The album was released in Serbia by City Records in q2, 2008. The albums contains the same songs from the album 192, just sang in Serbian.

Track listings
"92"
music: Darko Dimitrovarrangement: Darko Dimitrovlyrics: Elena Risteska & Aida Buraku
"Milioner"
music: Darko Dimitrovarrangement: Darko Dimitrovlyrics: Elena Risteska & Aida Buraku
"Kreveta Dva"
music: Darko Dimitrovarrangement: Darko Dimitrovlyrics: Aida Buraku
"Bye, Bye"
music: Darko Dimitrovarrangement: Darko Dimitrovlyrics: Aida Buraku
"Usne Boje Tamnog Mastila"
music: Darko Dimitrovarrangement: Darko Dimitrovlyrics: Snezana Vukomanovic
"Esen Vo Mene"
music: Darko Dimitrovarrangement: Darko Dimitrovlyrics: Kaliopi
"Romeo i Julija"
music: Darko Dimitrovarrangement: Darko Dimitrovlyrics: Elena Risteska i Aida Buraku
"Ninanajna"
music: Darko Dimitrovarrangement: Darko Dimitrovlyrics: Rade Vrčakovski
"Iskrene Suze"
music: Darko Dimitrovarrangement: Darko Dimitrovlyrics: Elena Risteska
"Ne Mogu"
music: Darko Dimitrovarrangement: Darko Dimitrovlyrics: Kaliopi
"Ni Na Nebo Ni Na Zemja"
music: Darko Dimitrovarrangement: Darko Dimitrovlyrics: Aleksandar Ristovski
"Ljubav Nije Za Nas"
music: Aleksandar Covicarrangement: Aleksandar Coviclyrics: Alek Aleksov

Release history

References

2008 albums